Gayda is a surname. Notable people with the surname include:

Ed Gayda (born 1927), American basketball player
Galina Gayda (born 1936), Russian sprinter
Jackie Gayda (born 1981), American wrestler
Toni Rose Gayda (born 1958), Filipina television personality
Virginio Gayda (1885–1944), Italian journalist